The Golden Osella is the name of several awards given at the Venice Film Festival. They are awarded irregularly and in various categories such as directing, screenwriting, cinematography, and technical contributions. 

The name derives from the osella, a medal awarded by the Doges of Venice to various persons between 1521 and 1797.

Best Cinematography

Best Director

Best Original Music

Best Screenplay

Best Set Design

Outstanding Technical Contribution

References

External links
 Venice Film Festival - Overview on IMDb

Italian film awards
Lists of films by award
Venice Film Festival